The eighth season of The Voice: la plus belle voix was broadcast on 9 February 2019 on TF1. It was also rebroadcast the next day on TFX. It was presented by Nikos Aliagas.

Season 8 began later in the year than the previous seasons of  The Voice  as Soprano and Jenifer were on tour until May, and were unavailable for filming the live shows. The live segments instead took place between the end of May and the beginning of June.

Coaches and hosts 

Julien Clerc, Jenifer, Mika and Soprano are the four coaches of Season 8. This is a different line-up of coaches than in its previous seasons. Coaches Pascal Obispo and Zazie from Season 7 were on tour and thus unable to participate in Season 8 as coaches. Coach Florent Pagny had announced at the end of Season 5 that his contract would end in 2018. Jenifer, a Season 8 coach who had served previously, made her comeback after three seasons off. Soprano, who has also worked as a coach in the Kids version, joined the Season 8 group. Julien Clerc replaced Florent Pagny.

Blind Auditions 

The final eighteen contestants for the show are chosen through a blind audition process. 

This is how it works: As each candidate performs, each coach is seated in a chair facing away from the candidate and toward the audience. The coaches listen to the candidates without being able to see them. If a coach likes what they hear, they press the buzzer in front of them, and their chair turns around to face the stage. This means that the coach wants to support the performer and wants them on their team. If only one coach has turned around by the end of the performance, then the singer joins that coach's team by default. However, if several of the coaches turn around, the performer can choose which team they want to join. For Season 8, a new feature was added whereby a coach was allowed to block another coach of their choice from being able to have a contestant on their team by pressing a different button before the other coach had pressed their buzzer. This feature could only be used once by each coach during the entirety of the blind audition process. By the end of the blind auditions, the coaches had narrowed the number of candidates down to eighteen final contestants.

Episode 1 (February 9) 
The first episode aired February 1, 2019 on television at 9:00pm. The coaches performed "Laissons entrer le soleli" by Julien Clerc for the opening of the blind auditions, as a nod to the new coach.

Episode 2 (February 16)

Episode 3 (February 23)

Episode 4 (March 2)

Episode 5 (March 9)

Episode 6 (March 16)

Episode 7 (March 23)

Episode 8 (March 30)

Knockouts (K.O.) 

The Season 8 rules for knockouts had changed from the rules in previous seasons. Each contestant sang a song of their choice. At the end of the performance, their coach had three options:
a) Send contestant directly to "The Battles" by pressing their button 
b) Send contestant to the Danger Zone (Zone Rouge)
c) Eliminate the contestant 

Each coach had six spots in Battles. At the end of Knockouts, a coach with remaining spots was allowed to give away the rest of his or her spots to those waiting in Danger Zone. Each coach had two steals which he or she could use on contestants in Danger Zone or on those who had been eliminated.

Color Key

Episode 9 (April 6)

Episode 10 (April 13)

Episode 11 (April 20)

Episode 12 (April 27)

The Battles

Episode 13 (May 4)

Episode 14 (May 11)

The Live Shows

Episode 15 (May 18)

Episode 16 (May 25)

Episode 17 (June 1)

Episode 18 (June 6)

Elimination Chart

Audiences

The Voice 

Legend :

References

External links 
Official Website of The Voice MyTF1.fr

The Voice: la plus belle voix
2019 French television seasons